Bletia florida is a species of orchid. It is native to Jamaica, Cuba and the Cayman Islands in the Caribbean. It is also reportedly naturalized in Trinidad & Tobago, as well as parts of Florida.

References

External links 

florida
Flora of Cuba
Flora of Trinidad and Tobago
Orchids of Jamaica
Flora of the Cayman Islands
Plants described in 1796
Flora without expected TNC conservation status